Vidukathai is a 1997 Tamil-language drama film directed by Agathiyan. The film stars Prakash Raj and Neena, while Manivannan and Janagaraj portray supporting roles. The music for the film was composed by Deva and the film opened to positive reviews in October 1997.

Cast
 Prakash Raj as Neelakandan
 Neena as Anandhi
 Manivannan
 Janagaraj
 Vijayan
 Balu Anand
 Suthangan
 Ramji
 Jegadeesh
 Akash

Production
Neena, a former child actress in Keladi Kanmani (1991), was selected to portray the lead role in Vidukathai when she was still at school and had to work on her schedules around exams. The production of the film was hampered by the FEFSI strike of 1997 and the makers had to postpone the venture from its original scheduled release date of June 1997. Subbu Panchu, son of producer Panchu Arunachalam worked as a dance choreographer for the film.

Music
The soundtrack was composed by Deva and lyrics were written by director Agathiyan himself along with Vaasan and Kalidasan.

Release
The film released in October 1997 to positive reviews with a critic from Indolink.com noting there is "excellent stylization of the characters, superior performance by all actors and a great story with a great ending". The site later listed the film amongst their top Tamil films for 1997, also praising Prakash Raj's portrayal of his character. New Straits Times praised the film's plot and the performances of lead actors.

References

External links

1997 films
1990s Tamil-language films
Films scored by Deva (composer)
Films directed by Agathiyan